Freedom Park, also known as Democracy Park, is a 1.2-hectare plaza in Phnom Penh, Cambodia. The park has been the location and focus for political demonstrations against Prime Minister Hun Sen's regime.

See also
 2013–2014 Cambodian protests

References

Geography of Phnom Penh
Parks in Cambodia
Tourist attractions in Phnom Penh